The East Asian model pioneered by Japan, is a plan for economic growth whereby the government invests in certain sectors of the economy in order to stimulate the growth of specific industries in the private sector. It generally refers to the model of development pursued in East Asian economies such as Japan, South Korea and Taiwan. It has also been used by some to describe the contemporary economic system in Mainland China after Deng Xiaoping's economic reforms during the late 1970s and the current economic system of Vietnam after its Đổi Mới policy was implemented in 1986.

The main shared approach of East Asian economies is the role of the government. For East Asian governments have recognized the limitations of markets in allocation of scarce resources in the economy, thus the governments have used interventions to promote economic development. Where key aspects of the East Asian model include state control of finance, direct support for state-owned enterprises in strategic sectors of the economy or the creation of privately owned national champions, high dependence on the export market for growth and a high rate of savings. It is similar to dirigisme.

Although there is a common theme, there is not one single approach to economy of Asian countries and it widely varies in economic structure as well as development experiences among the East Asian economies. Especially then between Northeast and Southeast Asian countries. (e.g. Malaysia, Indonesia and Thailand relied much more on FDI (Foreign direct investment) than Taiwan or Singapore)

This economic system differs from a centrally planned economy, where the national government would mobilize its own resources to create the needed industries which would themselves end up being state-owned and operated. East Asian model of capitalism refers to the high rate of savings and investments, high educational standards, assiduity and export-oriented policy.

Success of the model
East Asian countries saw rapid economic growth from the end of the Second World War to the East Asian financial crisis in 1997.  For instance, the percentage of annual average growth between 1970-96 was 3-5% in China, Hong Kong, Taiwan, South Korea and Singapore. Within this period, developing East Asian countries were growing at three times the rate of growth of the world economy. Hence these countries attracted a significant amount of foreign and private capital inflows. During this period, East Asian countries also achieved dramatic reductions in poverty; the greatest example is Indonesia, where the percentage of people living below the official poverty line fell from 60% to 12% between 1970 and 1996. Furthermore, Indonesia's population increased from 117 to 200 million. Equally impressive is the growth of real wages between 1980 and 1992, with average wages in newly industrialized Asian countries increasing at a rate of 5 percent a year, whereas at the same time employment in manufacturing increased by 6 percent a year. The growth period in East Asian countries saw a large improvement in overall standards of living.

Causes of GDP growth
Behind this success stands as was mentioned above export oriented economy which has brought high foreign direct investment and greater technological developments which caused significant growth of GDP. Big companies like LG, Hyundai, Samsung etc. were successful due to huge government support and its intervention into bank sector in order to direct banks to give credit to big companies. The governments in those countries were crucial in controlling trade union, provision, justice and also in providing the whole infrastructure (road, electricity, good education etc.). All this just made these countries more attractive for foreign investors. Along investors Asian countries got foreign aid from the West (especially from the United States of America in order to discourage communism as a Cold War Containment policy) and get better access to the Western markets.

Examples
“Eight countries in East Asia–Japan, South Korea, Taiwan, Hong Kong, Singapore, Thailand, Malaysia, and Indonesia–have become known as the East Asian miracle.” Beside successes of the East Asian economy  mentioned above in the Success of the model, there are 2 another example why they are called Asian miracle. 

 Japan:   The East Asian model of capitalism was first used in Japan after The Second World War in 1950. After war and American occupation, recovered Japan was considered a developing country (e.g. In 1952 Japan had lower total export value than India). The main development was between 1950 and 1980. It took Japan about 25 years, a non-competitive country (in steel production), to overcome Germany in producing cars (Germany was at that time the largest exporter of automobiles in the world. 5 years later, Japan produced more automobiles than the US. In a post-war period, The Korean war (1950-1953) can be seen as a turning point for The Japanese economy, as the country moved from depression to economic recovery. Japan, being occupied by The US military, was a staging place for the US-led United Nations forces deployed in The Korean peninsula. The country found itself in a good position to make a profit as Japanese goods and services were procured by the UN troops. This, along with economic reform, gave an initial boost for economy that will experience rapid growth for next half a century. In 1950s and early 1960s average annual growth rates were around 10% and later will even climb to 13%. In early post-war years Japan initiated economic reform, Zaibatsu corporations were dismantled, and agricultural land reform brought modern machinery and practises in recently distributed land, which meant that small agricultural producers can earn profit as opposed to the pre-war years where big land lords were owners of agricultural land. In 1960s Japan developed consumer-oriented economy, with industry orienting towards production of high-quality technological products aimed for exports as well as domestic market. Japanese exports rose rapidly and in subsequent years it became world leader in car manufacturing, shipbuilding, precision optical devices, high technology. Beginning with 1965 Japan started having a trade surplus and next decade saw Japan having third largest gross national product in the world. In 1970s the growth will significantly slow down partly due to oil crisis, as the country was heavily dependent on oil and food imports. In 1980s Japan diversified its raw material sources, due to economic misfortunes of the previous decade, and shifted its production’s emphasis towards telecommunication and computer technologies. Even though Japanese economic expansion ends in early 1990s, today Japan is the leader in highly sophisticated technology along with its traditional heavy industry products. Tokyo is one of the world most important financial centres home to Tokyo Stock Exchange, the world’s largest.

 Korea:  Korea followed Japan and despite its backward industrial development in nearly 40 years Korea was able to compete in chip developing the most important country in electronic chip technology, U.S.A. In the 1950s South Korea was one of the poorest countries in the world, heavily depended on foreign help provided mostly by the US. Beginning with early 1960s, country’s autocratic leadership initiated economic development reforms that paved the way for rapid economic expansion. Heavy protectionist policies only allowed imports of raw materials, which initiated domestic production of consumer goods. By 1990 average annual growth was around 9%. Family businesses that turned into big conglomerates (i.e. Samsung, Hyundai) had government financial help, for instance in a form of tax breaks, thus spearheading economic growth. South Korea became highly industrialised country with skilled workforce and along with Taiwan, Singapore and Hong Kong ended up being one of the Four Asian Tigers. However, in 1990s economic growth significantly slowed, which resulted in huge financial help from the International Monetary Fund of 57 billion USD, which was IMF’s largest intervention. In early 21st century South Korea enjoyed stable economy and the country initiated slow liberalisation.

Ersatz capitalism
Ersatz capitalism is Kunio Yoshihara's analysis of Southeast Asian economic development as a sort of 'pseudo-capitalism', referring to government and business actors’ abilities to utilize a nation's comparative advantages and artificially motivate an economy toward higher-end economic activities, specifically similar to those of developed Western nations, including areas such as capital investments and technologically intensive production.

Crisis
Besides many secondary actors in bringing out a crisis (such as a property price bubble, macroeconomic mistakes or a fall in a rate of growth of experts) the core of the crisis was in The East Asian model itself. The over-investment, misallocation of foreign capital inflows (Big corporations getting money from each other, whether investment was sufficient or not) and other problems in the financial sector. Another side of the government-controlled market were massive corruption, which was due to close relationship between government and business. This so called “crony capitalism” (which means influence of government and businessmen) led to crisis of confidence in the economies, firstly in Thailand and then other Asian countries drive into financial crisis in 1997. Because of the crisis GDP and export collapsed, unemployment went up, also inflation and as result all of this the governments accumulated huge foreign debt.

Other problems caused by the model in some countries
South Korea: Due to government interventions such as directed credits, regulations, explicit and implicit subsidies, the market had lack of discipline which has contributed to the problem of unproductive or excessive investment which has contributed in causing crisis.

Indonesia: Trade restriction, import monopolies and regulations have impeded economic efficiency, competitiveness, reduced the quality and productivity of investment.”   

Thailand: Political connectivity with the market have led to giving a priority to political affair at the expense of the economic decisions. For instance, delaying the implementation of necessary policy measures due general election in November 1996. In this and other cases, special interest has often influence on the allocation of budgetary resources and other public policy actions. 

Overall in a number of countries, there were inadequate disclosure of information and data deficiencies, direct lending. In general, there has also often been a lack of transparency in policy implementation, for example decisions with regards to public infrastructure projects and ad hoc tax exemptions.

IMF
In order to manage crisis and repay debt East Asian countries asked International Monetary Fund and World Bank for economic aid.

See also 
 Autarky
 Corporatism
 Chinese model
 Developmental state
 Dirigisme
 Economic interventionism
 Four Asian Tigers
 Nordic model
 Singapore model
 State capitalism
 Tiger Cub Economies

Further reading 
 Kristen E. Looney. 2021. "Mobilization Campaigns and Rural Development: The East Asian Model Reconsidered." World Politics.
Shiping Hua, Ruihua Hu. 2015. East Asian Development Model

References 

Capitalist systems
Economy of East Asia
Political-economic models